Raleigh is a small town in the Mid North Coast region of New South Wales, Australia, in Bellingen Shire. The town is south of Coffs Harbour and Sawtell and north of Nambucca Heads. It is located in Raleigh County and is perhaps named after it. It has one school, Raleigh Public School, which is located opposite a Norco dairy factory. A railway station on the North Coast line opened in 1915, but was subsequently closed and demolished.

References

Mid North Coast
Towns in New South Wales
Coastal towns in New South Wales
Bellingen Shire
North Coast railway line, New South Wales